La Bastide-l'Évêque (Languedocien: La Bastida de l'Avesque) is a former commune in the Aveyron department in the Occitanie region of southern France. On 1 January 2016, it was merged into the new commune of Le Bas Ségala.

The inhabitants of the commune are known as Episcopois or Episcopoises.

Geography
La Bastide-l'Évêque is located some 5 km east of Villefranche-de-Rouergue and 20 km south by south-west of Decazeville. Access to the commune is by the D911 which comes from Villefranche-de-Rouergue passing along the south-western border of the commune and crossing the narrow neck in the south as it goes east to Rieupeyroux. Access to the village is by the D69 which branches from the D911 on the western commune border and passes through the village continuing east to rejoin the D911 on the eastern border. The D269 goes north from the village then turns west following the northern border and continuing to Villefranche-de-Rouergue. The D905A branches from the D911 in the south of the commune and goes south-east to La Salvetat-Peyralès. Apart from the village the commune has a large number of hamlets:

Les Aliberts
Baraque de L'Ortal
La Baume
La Bessiêre
La Bouriette
Les Cabanelles
Cabanes
Les Cabayrols
Cadour
Le Cammas
Capredonde
Les Cayroux Blancs
Cazèles
Combe Nègre
Les Compans
Cruorgues
Fournies
Le Fraysse
Galdou
Gaudiês
Les Gazanes
Ginestous
Lascals
Laval
Lonnac
Maloyre
Mas de la Borie
Le Mazuc de Vézis
Montbressous
Mousset-Bas
Moussousse
L'Ortal
La Pâle
Pont du Cayla
Pouzoulet
Puech Loup
La Rangousie
Réquista
Le Rieu
Roumégous
Le Serayol
Le Serre
Teulières
La Vaysse
Vézes
Le Vialardel

The commune is mostly farmland interspersed with a few forests.

The Aveyron river forms most of the northern border as it flows west to eventually join the Tarn at Meauzac. The Lézert flows north through the commune to join the Aveyron on the northern border. The Verlanson also flows north joining the Lézert south of the village. The Ruisseau de Pouzoulet rises near Les Gazanes and also flows north to join the Aveyron. The Ruisseau de Caral rises in the east of the commune and flows north to join the Aveyron.

Toponymy
La Bastide-l'Évêque appears as la Baftide l'Evesque on the 1750 Cassini Map and does not appear at all on the 1790 version although the hamlet of Cadour does.

History
Founded in 1280 by Bishop Raymond de Calmont, La Bastide l'Évêque is one of the five Bastides in western Rouergue with Najac, Sauveterre-de-Rouergue, Villeneuve d'Aveyron, and Villefranche-de-Rouergue. This was the foundation of the Diocese of Rodez on the remains of Morlhon and Faidits to counter the county bastide of Villafranca (Villefranche-de-Rouergue) to limit its population, influence, and development. The bishop granted a charter in 1280 but politically it was a failure and remained a fortified village.

In the 14th century mining was very important with 13 mills called "martinets" operating in the Lézert Valley. They were used to smelt copper and make cauldrons. This activity continued until the end of the 19th century then died for lack of profitability.

Heraldry

Administration
List of Successive Mayors

Mayors from 1930

Demography
In 2012 the commune had 826 inhabitants.

Economy
The commune is mostly rural with many farms whose business ranges from cattle breeding but mostly sheep. Many tradesmen reside or work in the commune. Some people have chosen to settle in the commune but their occupation is in neighbouring towns like Villefranche-de-Rouergue or Rieupeyroux.

Culture and heritage

Civil heritage
A Gallo-Roman Bridge at Cayla
The Tower of Cayla
The Château de Villelongue at Cabanes. A former fief that belonged to the Adhémar de Monteil family then to the Raffin family
The Martinet de la Ramonde
The Chateau de Réquista (1630) is registered as an historical monument.

The Chateau de Réquista Picture Gallery

Religious heritage

The Church of Saint John the Baptist, a Romanesque Church from the 13th and 14th century with an imposing gate tower

Notable people linked to the commune
 Pierre Poujade, politician, died at La Bastide-l'Évêque on 27 August 2003.

Bibliography 
Christian-Pierre Bedel, preface by Pierre Marty, Riu-Peirós, La Bastida-de-l'Evesque, La Capèla-Bleis, Previnquièiras, Sent-Sauvador, Vabre-Tisac / Christian-Pierre Bedel e los estatjants del canton de Riu-Peiros, Rodez, Mission départementale de la culture, 1999, Al canton, 304 pages, ill., cov. ill. 28 cm, ISSN 1151-8375, BnF 37078683w

See also
Communes of the Aveyron department

References

Former communes of Aveyron
Populated places disestablished in 2016